John Mills (28 January 1855 – 27 June 1932) was an English first-class cricketer active 1875–85 who played for Nottinghamshire. He was born in Coddington and died in Ilkeston. He played in thirteen first-class matches as a right-handed batsman, scoring 140 runs with a highest score of 24.

References

1855 births
1932 deaths
English cricketers
Nottinghamshire cricketers
Non-international England cricketers
Lord Hawke's XI cricketers